is a squadron of the Japan Air Self-Defense Force based at Iruma Air Base in Saitama Prefecture north of Tokyo. It operates under the authority of the Air Tactics Development Wing. The squadron operates YS-11EB aircraft.

References

Units of the Japan Air Self-Defense Force